

List of ambassadors
Daniel Zohar-Zonshine 2021-
Yossi Avraham Shelley 2017 - 
Reda Mansour 2014-2015
Rafael Eldad 2011 - 2014
Giora Becher 2008 - 2011
Tzipora Rimon 2004 - 2008
Daniel Gazit 2000 - 2004
Yaacov Keinan 1995 - 2000
Shaul Ramati 1980 - 1983
Moshe Erell 1976 - 1980
Mordekhai Shneeron 1973 - 1976
Itzhak Harkavi 1971 - 1973
Shmuel Divon 1966 - 1968
Arie Eshel 1962 - 1964
Arie Aroch 1956 - 1959
Minister David Shaltiel 1952 - 1956

Consulate (Rio de Janeiro)
Consul General Eitan Surkis 2000 - 2002
Consul General Yoel Barnea 1994 - 1998
Consul General Ehud Gol 1988 - 1991 
Consul General Eliyahu Tabori 1983 - 1988
Consul General Yaakov Gotal 1978 - 1983
Consul General Ephraim Dowek 1974 - 1978
Consul General Itzhak Harkavi 1968 - 1972

Consulate (Sao Paulo)
Rafi Erdreich 2021-
Consul General Dori Goren (2016-)
Consul General Yoel Barnea 2013 - 2016
Consul General Ilan Sztulman 2010 - 2013 
Consul General Medad Medina 2000 - 2003
Consul General Dorit Shavit 1994 - 1999
Consul General Yosef Arad 1991 - 1994
Consul General Zvi Chazan1987 - 1991
Consul General Yehuda Yelon 1987 - 1989
Consul General Zvi Caspi 1984 - 1987
Consul General Efraim Eldar 1981 - 1984
Consul General Benjamin Bonney 1977 - 1981
Consul General Isachar Shamgar 1965 - 1968

References 

Brazil
Israel